Macao Dragon Company Limited was a start-up ferry company that offered services between the Hong Kong–Macau Ferry Terminal, in Sheung Wan, Hong Kong, and the Taipa Temporary Ferry Terminal in Taipa, Macau. It operated four 65m and 63m highspeed catamarans vessels powered by MTU Friedrichshafen engines using waterjet propulsion, which could accommodate up to 1,200 passengers.

History
Operations of the company began on July 10, 2010. As of September 2010, the first two vessels, Shen Long and Tian Long had entered service, providing five return trips between Macau and Hong Kong.

The Macao Dragon company went into liquidation and ceased operations from September 15, 2011.

Routes
  Hong Kong–Macau Ferry Terminal, Hong Kong ↔  Taipa Temporary Ferry Terminal, Macau

Fleet
The Macao Dragon fleet consisted of the following vessels:

 Shen Long, (Hull 189) 65m Highspeed Catamaran built by Marinteknik Shipbuilders(Singapore) - (delivered)
 Tian Long, (Hull 190) 65m Highspeed Catamaran built by Marinteknik Shipbuilders (Singapore) - (delivered)
 Huang Long, (Hull 191) 63m Highspeed Catamaran built by Marinteknik Shipbuilders (Singapore) - (delivery deferred)
 Pan Long, (Hull 192) 63m Highspeed Catamaran built by Marinteknik Shipbuilders (Singapore) - (delivery deferred)

Classes of Travel
 Dragon Suites - 8 or 4-seat private cabins, comfortable leather reclining seats
 First - generous seat pitch, comfortable leather reclining seats
 Premium Economy - comfortable leather reclining seats
 Economy - comfortable aircraft-style seating

Special features
 25 large 40"-50" Flat Screen TVs
 Dragon Suites feature plug and play AV connections to two 32" flat screen monitors with touch screen control panel
 2 Kiosks offering a wide selection of refreshments
 Satellite based Internet using Wi-Fi technology was available throughout the vessel
 Internet Cafe
 Starbucks Coffee
 Fiji Water

Technical specifications
Shen Long (Hull 189)

 Type: Aluminium hull fast catamaran ferry
 Passenger capacity: 1152 total
 Shipbuilder: Marinteknik Shipbuilders (S) PTE LTD.
 Length (LOA): 65 meters
 Beam: 16 meters Loaded
 Max.speed:37.5 knots
 Draught: 1.60 m
 Propulsion Generators: 4 x MTU 16V4000 M70
 WaterJet: 4 x MJP J850R QD
 Port of Registration: Hong Kong
 Classification: Lloyd’s Register of Shipping (LLOYDS) 100 A1 SSC Passenger(B) Catamaran HSC G4

References

Ferry companies of China
Chinese companies established in 2010
Companies disestablished in 2011